The Chevron Cars are anthropomorphic vehicles who were part of an advertising campaign of the Chevron Corporation consisting of television spots, print ads, billboards, and toy cars available at Chevron retail locations.

History
Their debut in television commercials on May 1, 1995, featured talking cars done in clay animation, with a variety of car colors each with different personalities. The commercials themselves, done in a similar fashion to the animated film and television series Creature Comforts, were crafted by Aardman Animations and used to promote Chevron with Techron. A year later, Chevron gas stations began selling the toy cars featured in the commercials.  Chevron underestimated demand in 1997 and increased production to 700,000 on each of 4 or 5 new models at the time, compared to 500,000 in the previous year.

Although originally designed for children, Chevron executives were surprised that adults started collecting the toy plastic cars as well. Older adults are among the most enthusiastic collectors of the Chevron Cars.

On October 2, 2001, Chevron issued the limited edition Hope car to raise awareness about the fight for a cure for breast cancer and raised about $300,000 in donations. This has been followed by a new breast cancer awareness each October through 2007 with profits going to relevant charities.

In 2007, Chevron began limited production of cars in association with major commercial sports and university teams based on their Victor E. Van car.

On July 26, 2011, Chevron announced that due to decreasing consumer demand, the production of the Chevron Cars would be discontinued. This brought to an end a period of fifteen years in which they were produced and sold.

Credits
The television ads were designed by advertising agency Young and Rubicam. The internet strategy, digital brand extension and the ecommerce component was created and managed by San Francisco web developer ISL Consulting, now part of ClearMetrics, Inc.  ISL Consulting also developed the original Chevron.com corporate website as well as numerous other web-based initiatives for the various Chevron operating companies.

Popular culture

The Chevron Cars television ads have been parodied in several television shows, including Robot Chicken, the animated comedy Family Guy (episode "Deep Throats"), and a MADtv sketch in which one of the cars gets fitted with a bomb and explodes after asking questions about the ticking.

See also
Cars - A franchise by Pixar featuring anthropomorphic vehicles, with their eyes being on the windows.

References

External links
The Chevron Cars
The Chevron Cars Blog
Chevron Cars as Branding Identity of Techron Gas

Aardman Animations
Automobile advertising characters
Chevron Corporation
Mascots introduced in 1995